Deportation of Americans from the United States is the wrongful expulsion, return or extradition of Americans to other countries, often after being convicted of a crime. These individuals in removal proceedings include Americans by birth and legal immigrants that were naturalized under  or admitted as nationals of the United States under the Child Citizenship Act of 2000. A U.S. citizen cannot legally be deported, and thus can return to the United States at any time.

Legal background 
Some have been placed in immigration detention centers to be deported but were later released. "Recent data suggests that in 2010 well over 4,000 U.S. citizens were detained or deported as aliens". 

Under , any officer mentioned in  may at any time, inter alia, cancel a "notice to appear" against any person who: (1) turns out to be a national of the United States; or (2) one that is not removable under the Immigration and Nationality Act (INA). And under , any Immigration Judge may terminate the removal proceeding of any person who turns out to be a national of the United States or one that is not removable under the INA. A "notice to appear" that contains material false information (and/or omits a material fact) legally makes the entire removal proceeding void ab initio.

Statutory, regulatory and judicial relief 
A forceful and illegal deportation from the United States entitles the victim to seek judicial relief. The relief may include a declaratory judgment with an injunction issued against the Attorney General or the Secretary of Homeland Security requesting appropriate immigration benefits and/or damages under the Federal Tort Claims Act (FTCA) as well as under Bivens v. Six Unknown Named Agents.

Physically removed Americans from the United States

A number of Americans have been placed in immigration detention centers to be deported but were later released. Up to one percent of all those detained in immigration detention centers are nationals of the United States according to research by Jacqueline Stevens, a professor of political science at Northwestern University.

The following is an incomplete list of Americans who have actually experienced deportation from the United States:
Pedro Guzman, born in the State of California, was forcefully removed to Mexico in 2007 but returned several months later by crossing the Mexico–United States border. He was finally compensated in 2010 by receiving $350,000 from the government.
Mark Daniel Lyttle, born in the State of North Carolina, was forcefully removed to Mexico but later returned to the United States from Guatemala and filed a damages lawsuit in federal court, which he ultimately won.
Andres Robles Gonzalez derived U.S. citizenship through his U.S. citizen father before being forcefully removed to Mexico. He was returned to the United States and filed a damages lawsuit in federal court, which he ultimately won.
Roberto Dominquez was born in Lawrence, Massachusetts. He was deported to the Dominican Republic. The government is unconvinced in this case as it claims that there are two people by the same name, both born during the same month and year. According to the government, both children were born to parents with the same addresses, and that one child was born in Santo Domingo, the capital of the Dominican Republic.
Esteban Tiznado-Reyna was born in Mexico to a father who had an Arizona birth certificate, which was found unreliable in an immigration court. Tiznado was found not guilty of illegal reentry into the United States in 2008, but ICE still deported him despite the verdict. Documents were uncovered that the USCIS withheld in the 1980s, showing his proof of citizenship.

See also 
 Deportation and removal from the United States
 Deportation of Korean adoptees from the United States
 List of people deported or removed from the United States
 Mexican Repatriation

Notes and references

External links 
 In America, Naturalized Citizens No Longer Have an Assumption of Permanence (The New Yorker, June 18, 2018).
 When ICE Tries to Deport Americans, Who Defends Them? (The New Yorker, March 21, 2018).
 The Largest Mass Deportation in American History (March 23, 2018).
 Is Trump about to deport an American citizen? (The Week, Jan. 25, 2018).
 Some Adoptees Are Undocumented Because Their Parents Forgot To Fill Out A Form. Now Congress Is Taking Action (The Intercept, May 14, 2019).

Deportation from the United States
Citizenship of the United States